Coulee is a type of valley or drainage zone.

Coulee may also refer to:
Lava coulee, a type of lava dome
Coulee City, Washington, a town in the United States
Coulee, Mountrail County, North Dakota, an unincorporated community in the United States
Coulee, Pembina County, North Dakota, a populated place in the United States
Rural Municipality of Coulee No. 136, a municipality in Canada 
Shea Couleé (born 1989), American drag queen
Coulee Experimental State Forest, a state forest in the United States

See also 
 
Coulee Region, also known as the Driftless Area, a region in the Midwest of the United States
 Grand Coulee (disambiguation)
 Coolie (disambiguation)